White Mansions is a 1978 concept album written by English singer-songwriter Paul Kennerley which imagines the lives of American Southerners in the Confederacy during the Civil War. The songs were performed by country singers, each portraying different characters in an attempt to show the Confederacy and the concept of "Southern pride" through their eyes. The album's vocalists included Waylon Jennings, Jessi Colter, John Dillon and Steve Cash. Eric Clapton played guitar on several tracks. The album charted at #38 on the Country Billboard chart and #181 on the Billboard 200.

In his autobiography, Waylon Jennings claims Kennerley was inspired to compose the songs after hearing "Let’s All Help the Cowboys (Sing the Blues)" on London radio, which had appeared on Jennings 1975 LP Dreaming My Dreams, and declared, "White Mansions is a lovely record, and it touched me in a deeply personal way, as a man whose house is built on a Civil War battlefield and a Southerner. Though it probably went over the heads of its intended audience, making the album was one of my most enjoyable experiences."

The album was re-released in 1999 in a two-for-one package with The Legend of Jesse James, a 1980 concept album conceived by Kennerley.

Characters
The four main characters portrayed in the album are:

Matthew J. Fuller (played by John Dillon) – The 23-year-old son of a Southern cotton planter, he received a full education in college and military academy. When the Civil War begins, he joins the Confederate Army infantry regiment as a captain.
Polly Ann Stafford (played by Jessi Colter) – Matthew's significant other; at the start of the war, she begins working in a hospital, tending to wounded and dying soldiers.
Caleb Stone (played by Steve Cash) – Representing the stereotype of "white trash", Caleb is a man who possesses neither a permanent job nor his own property or land, opting instead for accepting random jobs requiring little skill. He detests the powerful plantation owners of the South and fights against the Union to "preserve his superiority over the blacks".
The Drifter (played by Waylon Jennings) – The Drifter is the album's narrator. His real name is not known, but the listener is told that he was wounded fighting for Texas in the U.S.-Mexican War; during the Civil War, he doesn't participate in the fighting, traveling from town to town and commenting on the events that unfold instead.

In addition, a single brief track is performed by Rodena Preston's Voices of Deliverance credited as The Slaves; this, as is explained in the liner notes, is symbolic, in that, "despite the fact that they represented over a third of the population of the South, their voice was seldom heard".

Track listing
All songs written or co-written by Paul Kennerley; "White Trash" co-written by Bernie Leadon.

"Story to Tell (The Preface)" – 2:52
Performed by Polly
"Dixie, Hold On" – 3:14
Performed by The Drifter
"Join Around the Flag" – 2:16
Performed by Matthew
"White Trash" – 3:55
Performed by Caleb
"Last Dance and the Kentucky Racehorse" – 5:26
Performed by Matthew and Polly
"Southern Boys" – 2:58
Performed by Caleb
"Union Mare and the Confederate Grey" – 3:53
Performed by The Drifter
"No One Would Believe a Summer Could Be So Cold" – 2:59
Performed by Matthew
"The Southland's Bleeding" – 4:12
Performed by The Drifter
"Bring Up the Twelve Pounders" – 0:26
Performed by Matthew
"They Laid Waste to Our Land" – 2:33
Performed by Caleb, Matthew and The Drifter
"Praise the Lord" – 1:09
Performed by the Slaves
"The King Has Called Me Home" – 3:13
Performed by Caleb
"Bad Man" – 3:04
Performed by Matthew
"Dixie, Now You're Done" – 3:13
Performed by The Drifter

References 

Waylon Jennings albums
Jessi Colter albums
1978 albums
Concept albums
Collaborative albums
A&M Records albums
Albums produced by Glyn Johns